The 2008 edition of the Canadian Polaris Music Prize was presented on September 30, 2008, at the Phoenix Concert Theatre in Toronto. The prize was won by Caribou for his album Andorra.

Unlike in prior years, the Polaris Prize committee did not release a compilation album of songs from the nominated albums. Instead, customers who purchased one of the nominated albums in a record store were given a free card entitling them to download one free song from each album at iTunes.

Jury
The 2008 grand jury consisted of Mike Bell (Calgary Herald), Denise Benson (Eye Weekly), Evelyn Cote (Ici), Lana Gay (CBC Radio 3), Kevin Kelly (Newfoundland Herald), Joshua Ostroff (AOL Canada), James Stewart Reaney (London Free Press), Li Robbins (CBC Radio/The Globe and Mail), Hannah Simone (MuchMusic), Darryl Sterdan (Winnipeg Sun) and Frank Yang (Chromewaves).

Shortlist
The prize's 10-album shortlist was announced on July 7.
  Caribou, Andorra
 Black Mountain, In the Future
 Basia Bulat, Oh, My Darling
 Kathleen Edwards, Asking for Flowers
 Holy Fuck, LP
 Plants and Animals, Parc Avenue
 Shad, The Old Prince
 Stars, In Our Bedroom After the War
 Two Hours Traffic, Little Jabs
 The Weakerthans, Reunion Tour

Longlist
On June 12, for the first time in the three-year history of the award, the preliminary 40-album longlist was published.

References

External links
 Polaris Music Prize

2008 in Canadian music
2008 music awards
2008
2008 in Toronto